Sonesta may refer to:
Sonesta International Hotels
The Clift Royal Sonesta Hotel, a hotel in San Francisco
The Chase Park Plaza Hotel, a Royal Sonesta Hotel in St. Louis, MO
Sonesta Records, an Israeli record label

See also
Search for "Sonesta" in Wikipedia